Allahabad (also Romanized as Allāhābād) is a village in Hasanabad Rural District, Hasanabad District, Eqlid County, Fars Province, Iran. At the 2006 census, its population was 243, in 67 families.

References 

Populated places in Eqlid County